The UAB Blazers football statistical leaders are individual statistical leaders of the UAB Blazers football program in various categories, including passing, rushing, receiving, total offense, defensive stats, and kicking. Within those areas, the lists identify single-game, single-season, and career leaders. The Blazers represent the University of Alabama at Birmingham in the NCAA's Conference USA (C-USA). The football program returned in 2017 after a two-season hiatus.

UAB began competing in intercollegiate football in 1991. Entries on these lists tend to be dominated by more recent players, however, as regular seasons expanded from 11 to 12 games in 2002-03 and permanently in 2006. Additionally, the Blazers have played in three bowl games, the 2004 Hawaii Bowl, 2017 Bahamas Bowl, and 2018 Boca Raton Bowl, and also played in (and won) the C-USA Championship Game in 2018, giving that team a second extra game. Accordingly, the 2004, 2017, and 2018 seasons have a disproportionately high amount of entries.

These lists are updated through the 2018 season.

Passing

Passing yards

Passing touchdowns

Rushing

Rushing yards

Rushing touchdowns

Receiving

Receptions

Receiving yards

Receiving touchdowns

Total offense
Total offense is the sum of passing and rushing statistics. It does not include receiving or returns.

Total offense yards

Total touchdowns

Defense

Interceptions

Tackles

Sacks
During UAB's 2015–2016 football hiatus, the UAB Record Book did not list any sacks records. The 2013 UAB football media guide recorded top performances in sacks, and the 2018 media guide also does so.

Kicking

Field goals made

Field goal percentage

References

UAB